Bauan, officially the Municipality of Bauan,  is a 1st class municipality in the province of Batangas, Philippines. According to the 2020 census, it has a population of 90,819 people.

History

Religious attribution and miracles

The Augustinian church of Bauan was founded as a visita (small chapel without a resident priest) in 1590 on the slopes of Mount Macolod, along Taal Lake's southern shore.  The resident priest of Taal, Father Diego de Avila would visit periodically and attend to the spiritual needs of the settlement.

six years after the establishment of the ecclesiastical mission of Bauan, a giant cross made of anubing was found in a Diñgin (a place of worship) near the town of Alitagtag. In 1790, Castro y Amoedo found a Tagalog document in the Bauan Cathedral Archives, signed by 25 Indio elders, stating the cross was made around 1595, as protection from ghosts surrounding the Tolo fountain.  Subsequent miracles were associated with this cross.  On May 3, the 2.5 m tall cross was brought to the Chapel of Alitagtag.  A golden sun, with a human face, and radiating rays was added, while the devout would cut away pieces of the cross to make talisman replicas.  The elders also thought the cross protected the town from pestilence, locusts, drought, volcanic eruptions, and Moro pirates.

Today, the traditional folk dance of Bauan, subli, is a religious homage to the Cross of Alitagtag.   The dance is performed at a sambahan (place of worship), two of which are natural grottos along the shore of Taal Lake, and one of which is called Diñgin.

Bauan became an independent parish on May 12, 1596, but was re-annexed to Taal, its matriz (mother town), because of too few tributos (taxpayers).  Due to Taal Volcano eruptions, the town moved to Durungao (lookout point), led by Father Jose Rodriguez, in 1662.  The town moved again in 1671 to Loual, along Taal's Seno de Bauan.  An earthquake struck the town in 1677.  In 1689, Father Nicolas de Rivera helped the town build its third church.  In 1690, Father Rivera, with the help of the Taal parish priest Father Simon Martinez, moved the town to the seaside, its present location.  However, a typhoon destroyed the church in 1692.

A fourth stone church was built from 1695 to 1710.  The current church was built in 1762 by Father Jose Victoria and Don Juan Bandino.  A fort was built in 1775 to protect the town from Moro raids.

Fr. Jose Vitoria introduced the cultivation of indigo in Bauan while building the present church.  This was continued until 1856 during the administrations of Fr. Jose Trevino and Fr. Hipolito Huerta. It was completed under the supervision of Fr. Felipe Bravo in 1881. From there until 1894, final decorations were supervised by Fr. Moises Santos and Fr. Felipe Garcia. The church is said to be the most artistically built in the province of Batangas during that time. Father Bravo was also an imminent botanist who put up a museum of natural history and collected rare books that were lost when the church was razed by fire during the Philippine revolution against Spain in 1898. The church was probably rebuilt and again destroyed by fire in 1938. It has been restored since then.

In March 2019, the Black Nazarene visited the church to help funds for rebuilding after the church was damaged in the 2017 Batangas earthquakes.

The town of Bauan used to encompass a much more extensive area. However, throughout history, chunks of Bauan have been converted into municipalities; San Jose in 1765, San Luis in 1861, Alitagtag in 1901, Mabini in 1918, and San Pascual in 1969.

Geography
Bauan is one of the lowland towns of central Batangas that hosts some mountains and hills, with the tallest; Mount Durungao. It also has beach resorts with Sampaguita Beach in barangay Sampaguita in the western part of the town considered one of the more notable ones.

The town is bounded by the municipality of San Luis to the north, the municipality of San Pascual to the east, and the municipality of Mabini to the south/southwest. It is also bordered by Balayan Bay to the west and Batangas Bay to the southeast. Vehicles can access the municipality coming from those towns by way of large thoroughfares such as the Palico-Balayan-Batangas Road, the Bauan-Mabini Road and Makalintal Avenue.

According to the Philippine Statistics Authority, the municipality has a land area of  constituting  of the  total area of Batangas.

Barangays
Bauan is politically subdivided into 40 barangays.

Barangay San Teodoro was created in 1953 from the sitio of Pook ng Buhangin from Barrio Ilat and the sitio of Cupang from Barrio Gelerang Kawayan. In 1954, the sitio of Jipit in the barrio of San Antonio was converted into the barrio of Santo Niño, while the sitio of Pook ni Banal in the Barrio of Malaking Pook was converted into the barrio of Pook ni Banal. The next year, sitio Pinagcurusan in barrio Maricaban and sitio Pinagcurusan in barrio Tingloy were constituted into barrio San Jose, while sitio Pirasan in barrio Payapa was constituted into the barrio of San Juan. In 1956 portions of San Andres and Bolo were separated to form the barrio of San Miguel. The next year, sitio  Buhangin of barrio Magalanggalang was converted into barrio Orense.

Climate

Demographics

In the 2020 census, Bauan had a population of 90,819.

Economy

Bauan is one of three political entities included in Metro Batangas, and as such has contributed to its continuous growth in businesses and population. It is also home to a handful of tourist destinations and points of interest.

Restaurants found in the national capital region Metro Manila have their branches in the town including Jollibee, McDonald's, Mang Inasal, and Greenwich. There are also some shopping centers and malls, including Citimart Bauan and Saveway. Fresh fruits, vegetables, meat, and fish are sold there. Household items such as brooms, appliances, sewing supplies can also be found in the town's market.

The town is home to the famous Londres, a soft bread coated in sugar, and Pianono, a rolled bread with cream inside. Across from the market is Rory's Refreshment & Eatery, where one of the best lomi in the country can be found.

While Bauan is known as "the Gateway to Mabini," an adjacent town known for its beaches, Bauan has Sampaguita beach. It is a long, white-sand beach that is relatively underdeveloped but fairly accessible. and is already being flocked by tourists. There is also a river in Bauan called the Abaksa River that can be found in between Inicbulan and Balayong. It is a fairly shallow river with cool waters and is also relatively underdeveloped.

Notable people

 Gerville Luistro, 
Batangas 2nd District Representative
 Jejomar Binay, 13th Vice President of the Philippines
 Dennis Datu, ABS-CBN field reporter
 Joshua Garcia, actor, endorser
 Hermilando Mandanas, Governor of Batangas
 Cecilia Muñoz-Palma, former associate justice
 Voltaire Y. Rosales, former executive judge 
 Webster Gamier, a Freemason, and the first Metrology Engineer in the Philippines 
 Rommel Sandoval, Hero of Marawi siege
 Danicka Gwapa

Gallery

References

Further reading
 Thomas R. Hargrove, The Mysteries of Taal: A Philippine Volcano and Lake, Her Sea Life and Lost Towns

External links

Bauan Official Website
[ Philippine Standard Geographic Code]

Municipalities of Batangas
1590 establishments in the Spanish Empire
Populated places established in 1590